A cattle call is an open audition.

Cattle Call may also refer to:

 Cattle Call (film), a 2006 comedy film by National Lampoon
 Cattle Call (album), a 1963 album by Eddy Arnold
 "The Cattle Call", a song by Tex Owens
 Cattle Call (company), a video game company

See also
 Kulning, or cow-calling, a Scandinavian music form for calling livestock